Viktor Stretti, born Vítězslav Otakar Stretti (7 April 1878 in Plasy – 3 March 1957 in Dobříš) was a well known Czech etcher and lithographer. His brother was the etcher Jaromír Stretti-Zamponi.

External links
 http://www.galerie-vysocina.com/obraz.php?idautor=115
 http://www.batz-hausen.de/dvstret.htm
 http://www.kdykde.cz/vystavy/obrazy/praha/4361___viktor-stretti---vyber-25-grafickych-lisu-z-ranneho-obdobi

1878 births
1957 deaths
Czech etchers
Czech lithographers
20th-century Czech painters
Czech male painters
Czech people of Italian descent
Czech Freemasons
People from Plasy
20th-century Czech male artists
20th-century lithographers